Psilogramma bartschereri is a moth of the  family Sphingidae. It is known from Sri Lanka.

References

Psilogramma
Moths described in 2001
Endemic fauna of Sri Lanka